Chaux (German: Tscha) is a commune in the Territoire de Belfort department in Bourgogne-Franche-Comté in northeastern France. The immediate surrounding landscape is flat and arable.

International relations 

Chaux is twinned with Brinzio, Italy (2013).

See also

Communes of the Territoire de Belfort department

References

External links
Official website of the Mairie of Chaux 

Official website for the Ballon d'Alsace

Communes of the Territoire de Belfort